Agriocnemis dobsoni  is a species of damselfly in the family Coenagrionidae,
commonly known as a tropical wisp. 
It is a small damselfly; mature males have a white pruinescence over their body, and a dark end to their tail.
It is endemic to north-eastern Australia,
where it inhabits pools and swamps.

Etymology
In 1954, Frederic Fraser named this species dobsoni, an eponym in acknowledgement of a specimen collected by Roderick Dobson.

Gallery

See also
 List of Odonata species of Australia

References 

Coenagrionidae
Odonata of Australia
Insects of Australia
Endemic fauna of Australia
Taxa named by Frederic Charles Fraser
Insects described in 1954
Damselflies